Barthélémy Djabla (1936 – 15 September 2008) was the Ivorian Archbishop of the Roman Catholic Archdiocese of Gagnoa, based in Gagnoa, Côte d'Ivoire.

Biography 
Djabla was born in Mahibouo, Côte d'Ivoire. He was ordained a Roman Catholic priest on 15 March 1964, and became a bishop of the Roman Catholic Diocese of San Pedro-en-Côte d'Ivoire on 7 January 1990. He was further installed as the Archbishop of the Roman Catholic Archdiocese of Gagnoa on 24 September 2006.

Djabla remained Archbishop of Gagnoa until his death on 15 September 2008 in Abidjan at the age of 72, and was interred in Gagnoa's cathedral. He was succeeded as Archbishop of Gagnoa by Archbishop Joseph Ake Yabo.

References

External links 
 Catholic Hierarchy: Archbishop Barthélémy Djabla †

1936 births
2008 deaths
Ivorian Roman Catholic archbishops
People from Gôh-Djiboua District
20th-century Roman Catholic bishops in Ivory Coast
Roman Catholic bishops of San Pedro-en-Côte d'Ivoire
Roman Catholic archbishops of Gagnoa